The Val Viola Pass is a high mountain pass in the Alps on the border between Switzerland and Italy. It connects Poschiavo in the Swiss canton of Graubünden with Valdidentro in the Italian region of Lombardy. The pass lies at a height of 2,468 metres above sea level between Piz Val Nera and Corno di Dosdè.

The pass is traversed by a trail.

References

See also
Val Viola Pass on Hikr

Mountain passes of Italy
Mountain passes of the Alps
Italy–Switzerland border crossings
Mountain passes of Graubünden